Armand Garnet Ruffo (born in Chapleau, Ontario) is a Canadian scholar, filmmaker, writer and poet of Anishinaabe-Ojibwe ancestry. He is a member of the Chapleau (Fox Lake) Cree First Nation.

Life
Since receiving degrees from York University, the University of Ottawa, and the University of Windsor,  he has worked primarily as a scholar, teacher and writer.  His scholarly and creative writing has appeared in numerous literary anthologies and journals.

In the past, Ruffo has taught creative writing at the Banff Centre for the Arts, in addition to Indigenous literature, at the En'owkin International School of Writing in Penticton, B.C., and at Carleton University in Ottawa.  He currently resides in Kingston, Ontario, and teaches at Queen's University where he is the Queen's National Scholar in Indigenous Literature.

In 2014, Ruffo was awarded the Archibald Lampman Award for his poetry and was later nominated for the Governor General’s Literary Award in 2015. In 2017, Ruffo was awarded the Mayor's Arts Award by the City of Kingston for his publications.

His newest poetry book, TREATY#, was published in March 2019. Ruffo was nominated for the Governor General's Literary Award for Poetry.

In 2020 he was named the winner of the Latner Writers' Trust Poetry Prize.

References 

1955 births
Living people
20th-century Canadian poets
Canadian male poets
University of Windsor alumni
University of Ottawa alumni
Academic staff of Carleton University
People from Chapleau, Ontario
Writers from Ontario
First Nations poets
20th-century Canadian male writers
20th-century First Nations writers
21st-century Canadian poets
21st-century First Nations writers
20th-century Canadian dramatists and playwrights
21st-century Canadian dramatists and playwrights
Canadian male dramatists and playwrights
First Nations dramatists and playwrights
First Nations academics